Kate Boutilier (born August 2, 1966) is an American screenwriter whose credits include the animated television series Rugrats, The Wild Thornberrys, Holly Hobbie & Friends, and All Grown Up!, and the feature films The Wild Thornberrys Movie, Rugrats Go Wild, and Rugrats in Paris. She co-created and produced the series Poppy Cat and The Mr. Men Show, and is currently co-showrunning the Rugrats reboot.

Filmography

As a writer
 Falcon Crest (1986)
 Family Ties (1986)
 Just the Ten of Us (1988-1989)
 Baywatch (1990)
 She-Wolf of London (1991)
 Northern Exposure (1992)
 Growing Pains (1987-1989)
 Freshman Dorm (1992)
 Lois & Clark: The New Adventures of Superman (1994)
 Deadly Games (1995)
 Rugrats (1997-1998)
 The Famous Jett Jackson (1998)
 The Wild Thornberrys (1998-2000)
 Rugrats in Paris: The Movie (2000)
 The Wild Thornberrys Movie (2002)
 As Told by Ginger (2001-2002)
 Rugrats Go Wild (2003)
 All Grown Up! (2003-2007)
 Holly Hobbie & Friends (2006-2009)
 Olivia (2008-2011)
 The Mr. Men Show (2007-2009)
 Poppy Cat (2010-2014)
 Rugrats (2021) (2021-present)
 The Unstoppable Yellow Yeti (2022-present)

As a producer
 Rugrats (1991-1998)
 As Told by Ginger (2002)
 Olivia (2008-2011)
 The Mr. Men Show (2007-2009)
 Poppy Cat (2010-2014)
 Lilybuds (2018–present)
 Rugrats (2021) (2021-present)

As a story editor
 Growing Pains (1987-1988)
 Baywatch (1990)

Music
She has also written and composed songs for television and films.
 Rugrats Go Wild (2003)
 Holly Hobbie & Friends (2006-2009)

Awards

References

American television producers
American women television producers
American television writers
American women screenwriters
American women television writers
Living people
Place of birth missing (living people)
1966 births
21st-century American women